Rodney Lea Nichols (born December 29, 1964) is an American former professional baseball pitcher who played in Major League Baseball from 1988 to 1995 with the Cleveland Indians, Los Angeles Dodgers, and Atlanta Braves. Nichols was a three-year letterman at University of New Mexico. He also played one season in Japan for the Fukuoka Daiei Hawks in 1997.

Since retiring from playing, Nichols has worked as a minor league pitching coach for the Reading Phillies (2002–2004), Scranton/Wilkes-Barre Red Barons (2005–2006), Ottawa Lynx (2007), and Lehigh Valley IronPigs (2008–12) before being named the bullpen coach for the Philadelphia Phillies before the 2013 season. The Phillies opted not to retain Nichols following the 2015 season. He is currently pitching coach of the Iowa Cubs.

References

External links

1964 births
Living people
Albuquerque Dukes players
American expatriate baseball players in Japan
Atlanta Braves players
Baseball players from Iowa
Batavia Trojans players
Cleveland Indians players
Colorado Springs Sky Sox players
Fukuoka Daiei Hawks players
Kinston Indians players
Los Angeles Dodgers players
Major League Baseball bullpen coaches
Major League Baseball pitchers
New Mexico Lobos baseball players
Omaha Royals players
Philadelphia Phillies coaches
Richmond Braves players
Waterloo Indians players
Williamsport Bills players
Minor league baseball coaches